Contact high is a phenomenon that occurs in otherwise sober people who experience a drug-like effect just by coming into contact with someone who is under the influence of a psychoactive drug. In a similar way to the placebo effect, a contact high may be caused by classical conditioning as well as by the physical and social setting.

A 1970s glossary of drug users' language describes the term as "a psychogenic 'trip' without taking drugs, by being close to somebody while he is on drugs. Incorrectly [used] for the high obtained by inhaling the smoke of other marijuana smokers."

In Alexander Shulgin's book PiHKAL under the 2C-I entry, a notable reaction is observed in a participant who takes a placebo, existing in an environment with other people who are under the drug's influence. The participant wrote that he had "absorbed the ambience of the folks who had actually imbibed the material."

See also
 Substance abuse
 Hotboxing
 Body-centred countertransference

References

Drug culture